The WEY Macchiato is a Compact luxury crossover SUV produced by Great Wall Motor under the premium brand, WEY.

Overview

The Macchiato was presented during the Shanghai Auto Show in 2021. Sales started in April 2021 at Auto Shanghai in the Mainland Chinese market.

The crossover SUV is named after the macchiato coffee. With the Mocha and the Latte, two other vehicles of the brand named after coffee specialties were also presented at Auto Shanghai.

The Macchiato is similar in style to the Mocha and the Latte and utilizes the same Lemon architecture developed inhouse by Great Wall Motor with its independent rear suspension. 17- and 18-inch wheels are available depending on the trim level.

Powertrain
The Macchiato compact crossover is equipped with the DHT hybrid powertrain which is FWD only and not chargeable from charging ports and utility power network. The electric motor drives the car alone when the vehicle is traveling under , while the gasoline engine acts purely as a range extender at these low speeds, producing power for the main motor. During rapid acceleration, the petrol engine temporarily switches to driving the wheels. The traction battery sits beneath the rear bank of the vehicle and holds up to 1.7 kilowatt-hours of energy.

In terms of transmission, the fixed-axle gear train, with a two-speed gear ratio in engine direct drive mode, provides a maximum transmission efficiency of 97%. Great Wall Motors DHT see considered four levels of simulated gears.

ORA Cherry Cat (Big Cat)
An electric prototype based on the WEY Macchiato with the codename ORA Big Cat (大猫) was unveiled during the 2021 Shanghai Auto Show. The styling of the Big Cat is identical to the Macchiato except for the sealed front grilles and the ORA badging. By July 2021, patent images of the vehicle showed up with the name ORA Cherry Cat (樱桃猫), and listed performance features a  electric motor.

References

External links
Official website in Chinese

Macchiato
Crossover sport utility vehicles
Compact sport utility vehicles
Plug-in hybrid vehicles
Front-wheel-drive vehicles
All-wheel-drive vehicles
Cars introduced in 2021
Cars of China
Production electric cars